The Anglican Senior High School, Kumasi, is a co-educational public high school situated in Asem, a suburb of Kumasi in the Ashanti Region of Ghana. Founded in 1973, the present headmaster is Rev. Canon Senkyiri.

Crest 
The school's crest is composed of four elements: a golden shield with purple outline; a purple and white bishop's mitre; a purple Akan male stool; and a white scroll bearing the motto of the school, "Unity, truth and service". The shield refers to the "shield of faith" in Ephesians 6:16. The shield is also a symbol of defence and security. The indigenous Akan male stool in the centre of the insignia represents the contribution of traditional authorities towards the establishment and growth of the school. These contributions include the provision of land, guidance, and encouragement. The Anglican bishop's mitre symbolizes the school's religious affiliation with the Anglican Church. The mitre sitting on the stool also represents peace, harmony, and unity between the Church and the society through education. The white scroll located on the lower half of the crest bears the school's motto: "Unity, Truth and Service". Three colours are found in the school's crest: gold symbolizes honour and loyalty; purple symbolizes priesthood and kingship; white symbolizes purity and virtue.

History
In the early 1920s, the KASS site was acquired from the Amakom chief by the English Church Mission (E.C.M.) with the intention of establishing an institution to train clergy, and facilitate the growth of the church in the Gold Coast.

Bishop M. S. O'Rocke (1913–23) secured the services of the monks of the Benedictine Order (O.S.B.) from Nashdom Abbey, England, to run the newly founded institution. In 1952, St. Augustine's Theological College was established.

In 1972 when the second Republic (under Prime Minister Dr. K. A. Busia) was overthrown by Colonel I. K. Acheampong, the new government decided that numerous training colleges would be converted into secondary schools or closed. Anglican Training College was listed as one of those to close. The staff, supported by their principal Fr Aggrey, signed a petition asking the government not to close the college, but to convert it into a secondary school to be called Anglican Secondary School, Kumasi. The petition which was sent via the bishop, Rt. Rev. J. B. Arthur, who in turn wrote a covering letter approving of the petition. Both letters were forwarded to the then secretary of Education, Colonel Nkegbe in Accra. The petition was granted and in September 1973 Anglican Training College became Anglican Secondary School. It was a co-educational school but in 1987 stopped accepting girls as boarders. Fr P.D. Aggrey who was principal of the training college was retained as headmaster of the secondary school. He administered the school from 1973 to 1981 when he retired and was succeeded by Mr. John Poku between 1981 and 1986.  In 1987. Mr. A. E. Kyere (a.k.a. Kontonkyi) assumed duty as the third headmaster of the school. It was under him that the school improved academically. In 1999, the school was for the first time, invited to take part in the National Science and Maths Quiz Competitions. Rev'd Canon E.Y. Brobe-Mensah, assumed headship of the school in November 2003, remaining in post until 2010.

Headmasters

Campus 
There are seven houses on campus;

The school also has an assembly hall, five classroom blocks, science laboratories, ICT laboratories, an art studio and a library. The campus includes a basketball court and a football field.

Curriculum
The school provides a broad curriculum, including English, mathematics and sciences (either as integrated science or as separate disciplines of biology, chemistry and physics). In addition, the general arts curriculum offers courses in Christian religious studies, economics, English literature, geography, government, history and music. Language teaching includes French and Twi (Asante). Other curriculum areas include art, business, home economics and ICT.

Extracurricular activities
In 1999, the school began entering teams in the Ghana National Science and Maths Quiz, with varying degrees of success. In their first competition, the school was knocked out in the first round by eventual runners up Wesley Girls' High School, but in 2007 KASS reached the final.

Notable alumni 
 Lord Kenyamusician
 Dominic Adiyiahfootballer
 Amos FrimpongKotoko Captain
Elvis SakyiGhanaian footballer 
 Mr. Kwabena Kesse CEO Kessben Group of Companies, an alumnus of the school
 Noble Nketia Gospel Musician
 Prince Tuffour Musician
 Dr. Isaac Okyere Heart Surgeon at the Komfo Anokye Teaching Hospital 
 Alhaji Mubarak Mohammed Muntaka  Member of Parliament for Asawase 
Dr. Samuel Adu Amankwah  Researcher, University of Leeds
Dr. Philip Kofi Adom  Lecturer, UPSA - Ghana 
Thomas Forkuo  Bank of America
Kwabena Mintah Akandoh  Member of Parliament
Elijah Okyere  Pharmacist
Kofi Karikari  Veteran Administration, USA

See also 

 Education in Ghana
 List of senior high schools in Ashanti Region

References

External links 

 Government Website
 Archived version of the School Website from 2011/12.

1970s establishments in Ghana
1973 establishments in Africa
Anglican schools in Africa
Boarding schools in Ghana
Christian schools in Ghana
Educational institutions established in 1973
High schools in Ghana